Sing Sing Sing may refer to:

"Sing, Sing, Sing (song)", 1936 big band song by Louis Prima, famously performed by Benny Goodman
Sing Sing Sing (album), live album by Mel Tormé
Sing! Sing! Sing!, 1987 album by John Pizzarelli
Sing, Sing, Sing (TV series), Australian music television series in the early 1960s

See also
Sing (disambiguation)
Sing Sing (disambiguation)